Shyamji Kanojia (1955/56 – 3 January 2021) was an Indian cricketer who played for Railways in four first-class matches during the 1976–77 Ranji Trophy.

Death 
He died on 3 January 2021 at the age of 65 due to a heart attack while playing in a senior veterans cricket match in Virar. It was reported that he played in the match amid severe chest pain and died on the ground while fielding.

References

External links 
 

1950s births
Year of birth uncertain
2021 deaths
Indian cricketers
Railways cricketers
Cricketers from Mumbai
Sport deaths in India
Cricket deaths